1988 in the Philippines details events of note that happened in the Philippines in the year 1988.

Incumbents

President: Corazon Aquino (PDP-Laban)
Vice President: Salvador Laurel (UNIDO)
Chief Justice: 
 Claudio Teehankee (until April 18)
 Pedro Yap (April 18 – July 1) 
 Marcelo Fernan (starting July 1)
 Philippine Congress: 8th Congress of the Philippines
 Senate President: Jovito Salonga (Liberal)
 House Speaker: Ramon V. Mitra, Jr. (LDP, 2nd District Palawan)

Events

January
 January 18 – First local elections under the Aquino administration are held. Administration candidates win a majority of the local seats.
 January 28 – Toymaker company Mattel Incorporated announces the closure of its Philippine subsidiary, with 3,000 job losses.

February
 February 4 – Cardinal Sin announces the closure of the National Secretariat for Social Action for the claims of infiltration by communists.
 February 27 – Thirteen members of the elite anti-insurgency Scout Rangers are killed in an ambush near Camalig, Albay.

March
 March 9 – Amnesty International publishes a report on the cases of human rights violations by the Aquino administration committed by military and paramilitary groups; report is rejected by the government.
 March 19 – Guerrilla leader Elizardo Lapuz is captured by the police near Clark Air Base.
 March 28 – A New People's Army (NPA) attack kill 7 of the bodyguards of Malabon mayor Prospero Oreta, who was wounded thereafter.
 March 29 – Seven leading Communist Party of the Philippines (CPP) and NPA members, among them Romulo Kintanar and Napoleon Manuel, captured in Manila.

April
 April 2 – Col. Gregorio Honasan, leader of the August 1987 coup attempt, together with 13 of his guards, escapes from a prison ship in Manila Bay. Eight navy guards who helped him to escape are captured in Manila, Apr. 15.
 April 8 – Honasan's accomplice, Lt. Col. Edgardo Martillano, escape with his escort while on temporary release from jail.

May
 May 4 – Josefa Edralin Marcos, mother of former Pres. Ferdinand Marcos, dies in Manila, aged 95. Her son's request to return to the Philippines for her funeral would be later denied twice.
 May 11 – A military court convicts 106 soldiers and acquits one, all took part in the January 1987 coup attempt.

June
 June 4 – Mine tunnels collapse on Mount Lablab, Sibutad, Zamboanga del Norte, killing at least 27 people.
 June 10 – The Comprehensive Agrarian Reform Program (CARP, Republic Act No. 6657) is signed by Pres. Cojuangco–Aquino into law, providing land reform for farmers; to be effective within 20 years.
 June 30 – Polytechnic University of the Philippines head Nemesio Prudente, survived in a gun attack in November 1987, is seriously wounded in a street ambush in Manila wherein three of his aides are killed.

July
 July 7 – Murder charges are filed by the police against Fernando Suangco, alleged leader of a communist "sparrow unit" in Angeles City suspected of killing two Americans and three local police officers.
 July 25 – Pres. Aquino, in a state of the nation address, announces the formation of Citizen Armed Force Geographical Unit, and orders the dissolution of vigilante groups.

September
 September 16 – Political organization Laban ng Demokratikong Pilipino (LDP) formed
 September 13 – Generics Act of 1988 (Republic Act No. 6675) was signed by President Aquino in order to require and ensure the production of an adequate supply, distribution, use and acceptance of drugs and medicines identified by their generic name.

October
 October 18 – The Interior Bases Agreement between the Philippines and U.S was signed.
 October 22 – Former Pres. Ferdinand Marcos and his wife are charged in the United States regarding illegal money transfer.
 October 23–24 – Typhoon Unsang struck into Luzon resulted in a widespread flooding and landslides. The storm and flood brought scores of fatalities.
 October 24 – Interisland ferry MV Doña Marilyn sinks off Leyte during a typhoon, killing 389.

November
 November 7 – The Tower of Power transmitter was inaugurated by President Aquino and GMA Network board of directors following the transmitter's opening and a musical special.

December
 December 13 – A military court acquits former Col. Rolando Abadilla, Manila's security chief under the administration of Pres. Marcos and then Ilocos Norte vice-governor, of charges of plotting coup attempts against President Aquino.

Date unknown
 May – Abante established as a second post-revolution tabloid newspaper.

Holidays

As per Executive Order No. 292, chapter 7 section 26, the following are regular holidays and special days, approved on July 25, 1987. Note that in the list, holidays in bold are "regular holidays," and those in italics are "nationwide special days".

 January 1 – New Year's Day
 March 31 – Maundy Thursday
 April 1 – Good Friday
 April 9 – Araw ng Kagitingan (Bataan and Corregidor Day)
 May 1 – Labor Day June 12 – Independence Day  August 28 – National Heroes Day November 1 –  All Saints Day
 November 30 – Bonifacio Day December 25 – Christmas Day December 30 – Rizal Day' December 31 – Last Day of the Year''

In addition, several other places observe local holidays, such as the foundation of their town. These are also "special days."

Television

Sports
 September 17–October 2 – The Philippines participates in the 1988 Summer Olympics held in Seoul, South Korea and ranked 61st. Only boxer Leopoldo Serantes received his bronze medal and placed third in boxing.
 October 7 – The Ateneo Blue Eagles wins the UAAP Season 51 men's basketball tournament against the De La Salle Green Archers at Rizal Memorial Coliseum in Manila.

Births
 January 2 – Diane Querrer, news anchor
 January 6 – Mikael Daez, actor, basketball player and TV commercial, print and ramp model
 January 8 – Gretchen Espina, singer
 January 16 – Alex Gonzaga, TV host, actress
 January 21 – Glaiza de Castro, singer and actress
 February 4 – Calvin Abueva, basketball player
 February 28 – Mark Luz, actor and model
 February 14 – Javier Patiño, football player
 February 27 – Iain Ramsay, football player
 February 29 – Milan Melindo, Filipino boxer
 March 2:
 Roland Müller, football player
 Nadine Samonte, actress  
 March 3 – Patricia Tumulak, beauty queen, and host
 March 6 – Isabelle Daza, actress and model
 March 9 – Alodia Gosiengfiao, actress, singer, TV presenter, model and cosplayer
 March 15 – Jolo Revilla, actor and politician
 April 2 – Ellen Adarna, actress and model
 April 6 – Melai Cantiveros, actress, comedian and TV host
 April 10 – April Love Jordan, beauty pageant titlist; Miss World Philippines 2012 3rd Princess (d. 2019)
 April 14 – Francis Mossman, actor and model
 April 21 – JR Buensuceso, basketball player
 April 22 – Chad Kinis, comedian
 April 24 – Jinri Park, actress, model and radio DJ
 April 25 – Dasuri Choi, dancer and entertainer
 April 26 – Hazel Ann Mendoza, actress
 April 27 – Mark Bringas, basketball player
 May 2 – AJ Pareja, former Ateneo Blue Eagles men's volleyball player
 May 9 – RK Bagatsing, actor and model
 May 12 – Marky Cielo, actor and dancer (d. 2008)
 May 13 - Paulo Avelino, actor and model
 May 19 – Greg Slaughter, men's basketball player
 May 20:
 Carla Humphries, actress and model
 Katarina Perez, actress and model
 May 23 – Vaness del Moral, actress
 May 27 – Yam Concepcion, film and television actress
 June 9 – Martin Steuble, football player
 June 11 – Gabriel Valenciano, actor and dancer
 June 15 – Kevin Santos, actor
 July 7 – Venus Raj, Miss Universe 2010, 4th runner–up
 July 17 – Jason Pagara, boxer
 July 19 – Simon Atkins, basketball player
 July 22 – Renz Ongkiko, news anchor model and journalist
 July 25 – Sarah Geronimo, singer, actress and TV host
 August 11 – Rabeh Al-Hussaini, basketball player
 August 24 – Helga Krapf, actress
 August 26 – Niña Jose, actress
 August 29 – Iwa Moto, actress
 September 2 – Heidi Gem Ong, former Ateneo Blue Eagles lady swimmer
 September 6 – Jed Montero, actress
 September 7 – Robby Celiz, basketball player
 September 9 – JM de Guzman, actor, singer and model
 September 10 – Maico Buncio, motorcycle driver (d. 2011)
 September 18 – Lester Alvarez, basketball player
 September 30 – Simon Greatwich, football player
 October 4 – Joseph Marco, actor
 October 5 – Maja Salvador, actress
 November 4 – Michelle Madrigal, actress
 November 5 – Enchong Dee, actor, former De La Salle Green Archers swimmer and younger brother of AJ Dee
 November 6 – Eric Cray, track and field athlete
 November 10 – Pauleen Luna, TV host, actress and wife of Vic Sotto
 November 15 – Jace Flores, actor and model 
 November 17 – Chris Exciminiano, basketball player
 November 19 – J. C. Santos, actor
 November 20: 
 Ariella Arida, Miss Universe 2013, 3rd runner–up
 Edgar Allan Guzman, actor and model
 November 28 – Daniel Matsunaga, actor and model
 December 2 – Athena, singer and stage actress
 December 4 – Yeng Constantino, singer
 December 5 – Chris Ellis, basketball player
 December 9 – Matthew Manotoc, athlete and politician
 December 14
 Eda Nolan, actress
 Vanessa Hudgens, American entertainer of Filipino ancestry
 December 25 – Heather Cooke, football player
 December 28 – AJ Banal, boxer

Deaths
 January 17 – Roy Padilla, Sr., Governor of Camarines Norte (b. 1926)
 January 28 – Anastacio Malang, acting mayor of Arayat, Pampanga
 April 9 – Arturo Belleza Rotor, medical doctor, civil servant, musicianm and writer (b. 1907)
 May 4 – Josefa Edralin Marcos, mother of former President Ferdinand Marcos (aged 95)
 June 11 – Ernani Cuenco, composer, film scorer, musical director and music teacher (b. 1936)
 July 27 – Antonio Tantay, Olympic basketball player (b. 1920)
 August 21 – Teodoro de Villa Diaz, guitarist and composer (b. 1963)
 August 27 – Mario Montenegro, actor (b. 1928)
 September 12 – Mars Ravelo, graphic novelist (b. 1916)
 September 13 – Julian Banzon, biochemist and a National Scientist of the Philippines (b. 1908)
 September 27 – Teofilo Camomot, Roman Catholic archbishop of Cagayan de Oro (b. 1914)
 September 30 – Chino Roces, founder and owner of Associated Broadcasting Corporation and the Manila Times (b. 1913)
 October 31 – Gregorio F. Zaide, historian, author and politician (b. 1907)

References